Yuan Shuai is a Chinese actor and host who was formerly based in Singapore.

Career
Yuan came to prominence after winning MediaCorp's U Are the One in 2008, a talent search for Channel U's Fresh Face of the Year. He signed with MediaCorp as a full-time artist and was given his first hosting roles. He also began acting minor roles in various TV dramas before landing roles in major productions such as Rescue 995 and Unriddle 2.

He graduated with a diploma in theatre studies from Nanyang Academy of Fine Arts.

Hiatus
In March 2014, Yuan Shuai spoke of his family's situation in China and shared that his father was still recuperating from a bone marrow surgery he underwent in 2013. There were talks of the actor leaving showbiz to take over his family business then, but the rumours were proved baseless when Yuan Shuai clarified desire to continue acting.

In the latest turn of events, Yuan Shuai has confirmed that he will not be renewing his contract with MediaCorp when it expires end October this year, as his father is critically ill and suffering from blood cancer.

In a phone interview with the actor this afternoon, he shared that his dad's ailing condition was kept a secret from him as he was busy filming Mind Games in Kuala Lumpur, Malaysia. “They didn’t inform me of his medical condition as they didn’t want me to worry over it.”

He was finally told the news when filming wrapped and when his dad had to receive emergency treatment due to a deterioration of his medical condition.

“I gave this some thought. I left home 14 years ago [to come to Singapore] and haven’t spent much time with him. He really needs me in this critical period of time,” said Yuan Shuai. “My dad was really happy when I told him I was coming back home.”

“It’s time to fulfill my duties as a son and I want to spend more time with him,” he added. “I feel guilty because I didn’t get the chance to spend time with him as I was away from home for a long period of time, taking only short breaks to visit home in-between work.”

This will not be a permanent farewell to showbiz, however, says Yuan Shuai, who hopes to take on ad-hoc TV projects when time allows. “I’m too used to my current lifestyle in Singapore, I’ll still comeback,” said the Singapore PR (Permanent Resident).

A statement released by the MediaCorp management this afternoon read: “Yuan Shuai left China for Singapore 14 years ago, he will want to go back to his family at this trying time to spend as much quality time with his father as possible. He will not be taking up any jobs at this moment, until he finds the situation fit for him to do so in due. Yuan Shuai will be flying back to China after he settles his tenancy matters in Singapore.”

Especially grateful towards the care and support received from his MediaCorp colleagues, Yuan Shuai said, “I want to thank the artiste management unit, directors and producers for giving me a chance, Zhang Zhen Huan, Lee Teng, Pornsak, Rebecca Lim and my friends for their constant care. They are like family to me.”

When asked if acting would have to take a backseat because of the family business, Yuan Shuai replied that it is currently under his uncle's supervision.

Filmography

Television

Movies

Variety/Info-Ed Shows

References

External links
Profile on xin.msn.com

Living people
Singaporean male television actors
Nanyang Academy of Fine Arts alumni
1981 births